Isabella Tovaglieri (born 25 June 1987 in Busto Arsizio) is an Italian politician and a Member of the European Parliament since 2019.

References

1987 births
Living people
MEPs for Italy 2019–2024
21st-century women MEPs for Italy
Lega Nord MEPs